Collines-du-Basque is an unorganized territory in the Gaspésie–Îles-de-la-Madeleine region of Quebec, Canada.

Demographics

Population

See also
 List of unorganized territories in Quebec

References

Unorganized territories in Gaspésie-Îles-de-la-Madeleine